Nenad Vasilić is a Serbian bassist.

Early life and education
Nenad Vasilic was born in Niš, Serbia.
He started playing piano at the age of 5. At the age of 12 he received his first bass guitar and at the age of 15 he enrolled in the Secondary Music School in Niš. When he was 19 he studied contrabass and bass guitar at the Jazz Academy in Graz, Austria.

Career
In 1998, Vasilić formed his own band "Vasilić Nenad Balkan Band" and in 1999, he recorded his first album called "Jugobasija" in Austria.
He has produced albums as a band leader, double bass player and composer and collaborated with Mark Murphy, the American jazz singer Sheila Jordan, Ritchie Beirah, Peter Ralchev, Vlatko Stefanovski, Wolfgang Puschnig, Bojan Zulfikarpasic, John Hollenbeck (musician), Martin Lubenov, Stjepko Gut, Bilja Krstić, Tamara Obrovac, Lori Antonioli, Amira Medunjanin and others.

Discography
 Nenad Vasilic "Yugobassia" 1999
 Nenad Vasilic Balkan Band "Joe Jack" (Nabel Records) 2003
 Nenad Vasilic Balkan Band "Live in ORF" (ORF (broadcaster)) 2004
 Nenad Vasilic "Honey & Blood" (Connecting Cultures) 2006
 Nenad Vasilić & Armend Xhaferi "Beyond the Another Sky" (Extraplatte ) 2001/2008
 Nenad Vasilic "Just Fly" (Extraplatte) 2010
 Nenad Vasilic "Seven" (Galileo 2012)
 Nenad Vasilic "The Art of the Balkan Bass" (Galileo) 2015
 Nenad Vasilic "Wet Paint" (Galileo) 2016
 Nenad Vasilic "Live in Theater Akzent" (Galileo) 2017
 Nenad Vasilic "Bass Room" (Galileo) 2019
Nenad Vasilic "Vol.1" (Galileo) 2020

References

1975 births
21st-century bass guitarists
Musicians from Niš
Serbian bass guitarists
21st-century Serbian musicians
Living people